Jessica Jane Lord (born 29 July 1998) is an English actress and dancer. She is known for her roles as Lola in the fifth season of the Family series The Next Step (2017) and Lena Grisky in the Hulu series Find Me in Paris (2018–2020).

Early life
Lord was born in Rochdale, Greater Manchester. When she was six, her family relocated to Toronto, Canada. She attended high school at O'Neill Collegiate and Vocational Institute in Oshawa, specialising in dance. She later attended the Centennial College Theatre Arts and Performance.

Career
In 2015, Lord made her onscreen debut as a dancer in four episodes of The Next Step. Then in 2017, she became a series regular on the fifth series of The Next Step as Lola. In 2018, Lord was cast in the Hulu series Find Me in Paris as Lena Grisky, a role she portrayed until the series ended in 2020. In 2019, she appeared in an episode of Ransom, and in 2020, she made an appearance in the pilot episode of Party of Five.

Filmography

References

External links
 

Living people
1998 births
21st-century English actresses
Actors from Rochdale
English ballerinas
English emigrants to Canada
English expatriates in Canada
English expatriates in France
English female dancers
English television actresses
People from Rochdale